Ulmus 'Morton Plainsman' (selling name ) is a hybrid cultivar raised by the Morton Arboretum from a crossing of Siberian Elm (female parent) and a Japanese Elm grown from openly pollinated seed donated by the Agriculture Canada Research Station at Morden, Manitoba. Tested in the US National Elm Trial coordinated by Colorado State University,  averaged a survival rate of 78% after 10 years.

Description
 has modest upright growth, increasing in height by an average of 0.8 m in an assessment at U C Davis, with leaves much the same size and colour of the American Elm.

Pests and diseases
Although resistant to Dutch elm disease in the US,  remains very susceptible to pests such as the elm-leaf beetle Xanthogaleruca luteola 
, Japanese beetle, and cankerworms.

Cultivation
In trials at the University of Minnesota,  was found to have the second highest (after ) incidence of branch breakage occasioned by bark inclusions. However, the tree has a high degree of drought and cold tolerance making it particularly suitable for afforestation in the Great Plains. In artificial freezing tests at the Morton Arboretum the LT50 (temp. at which 50% of tissues die) was found to be −40°C.

The tree is currently being evaluated in the National Elm Trial  coordinated by Colorado State University. It is not known to have been introduced to Australasia.

Hybrid cultivars
 was crossed with the hybrid cultivar ; a selection from the resultant seedlings was marketed under the name 'Charisma', later changed to 'Morton Glossy' = .

Accessions
North America
Bartlett Tree Experts, US. Acc. nos. 2001–106, 2001-108
Brenton Arboretum, US. 5 trees, acquired 2009. Acc. no. not known. 
Chicago Botanic Garden, US. 2 trees, no other details available.
Dawes Arboretum , US. 3 trees, no acc. details available.
Holden Arboretum, US. Acc. no. 00–127
Morton Arboretum, US. Acc. nos. 273–97, 4–2004, 156–2005.
Smith College, US. Acc. no. 36505
University of Idaho Arboretum, US. Two trees. Acc. no. 2000093
Europe
Grange Farm Arboretum, Lincolnshire, UK. Acc. no. 1139.

Nurseries
North America
Acorn Farms , Galena, Ohio, US.
Bailey Nurseries , St. Paul, Minnesota, US.
J. Frank Schmidt & Son , Boring, Oregon, US.
Johnson's Nursery , Menomonee Falls, Wisconsin, US.
Sun Valley Garden Centre , Eden Prairie, Minnesota, US.

References

External links
http://fletcher.ces.state.nc.us/programs/nursery/metria/metria11/warren/elm.htm  Warren, K., J. Frank Schmidt & Son Co. (2002).  The Status of Elms in the Nursery Industry in 2000. 
http://www.mortonarb.org/plantinfo/plantclinic/phc/New-Elms-For-The-Landscape.pdf. Miller, F. (2002). New elms for the landscape and urban forest.

Hybrid elm cultivar
Ulmus articles missing images
Ulmus